Caggiano is a town and comune in the province of Salerno in the Campania region of south-western Italy.

Geography
Located near the Basilicata region, Caggiano borders the municipalities of Auletta, Pertosa, Polla, Salvitelle, Sant'Angelo Le Fratte (PZ), Savoia di Lucania (PZ) and Vietri di Potenza (PZ). It includes the hamlets (frazioni) of Calabri, Fontana Caggiano I, Mattina, Mattina V, and Piedi L'Arma.

Gallery

See also
Alburni
Vallo di Diano

References

External links

Cities and towns in Campania